Sophisticated Ladies is a musical revue based on the music of Duke Ellington. The musical ran on Broadway in 1981–83, earning 2 awards and 8 nominations at the 35th Tony Awards.

Production
Sophisticated Ladies  opened on Broadway at the Lunt-Fontanne Theatre on March 1, 1981 and closed on January 2, 1983 after 767 performances and fifteen previews. The musical was conceived by Donald McKayle, directed by Michael Smuin, and choreographed by McKayle, Smuin, Henry LeTang, Bruce Heath, and Mercedes Ellington. Scenic design was by Tony Walton, costume design by Willa Kim and lighting design was by Jennifer Tipton. The original cast included Gregory Hines, Judith Jamison, Phyllis Hyman, Hinton Battle, Gregg Burge, and Mercer Ellington. Hines' older brother Maurice joined the cast later in the run.

Music
The score includes "Mood Indigo", "Take the "A" Train", "I'm Beginning to See the Light", "Hit Me With a Hot Note and Watch Me Bounce", "Perdido", "It Don't Mean a Thing (If It Ain't Got That Swing)", "I Let a Song Go Out of My Heart", "Old Man Blues", "In a Sentimental Mood", "Sophisticated Lady", "Don't Get Around Much Anymore", "Satin Doll", and "I Got It Bad and That Ain't Good", among many others.

Critical reception
In his review for The New York Times, Frank Rich wrote that[T]he new musical revue at the Lunt-Fontanne, is an Ellington celebration that just won't quit until it has won over the audience with dynamic showmanship. It's not a perfect entertainment - let's save the flaws for later - but it rides so high on affection, skill and, of course, stunning music that the lapses don't begin to spoil the fun. What's more, this is the only Broadway revue of recent vintage that operates on a truly grand scale.

Awards and nominations

Original Broadway production

References

External links
 
 Sophisticated Ladies at Floormic.com

1981 musicals
Broadway musicals
Cultural depictions of Duke Ellington
Revues
Tony Award-winning musicals